Neckera complanata, the flat Neckera, is a species of moss of the genus Neckera and is member of the Neckeraceae family. This species of moss was found in the colon of the Tyrolean Iceman.

References

Neckeraceae